Daumesnil is a station on Line 6 and Line 8 of the Paris Métro in the 12th arrondissement.

History
The station opened on 1 March 1909 with the opening of the original section of Line 6 from Place d'Italie to Nation (although part of Line 5—some dating back to 2 October 1900—was incorporated into Line 6 on 12 October 1942). The Line 8 platforms opened on 5 May 1931 with the extension of the line from Richelieu–Drouot to Porte de Charenton.

It is named after Avenue Daumesnil, which honours General Pierre Yrieix Daumesnil (1776–1832) who lost a leg at the Battle of Wagram. This station is near Place Félix Éboué and its name plates refer to Félix Éboué (1884–1944), who brought Chad over to the Free French Forces in 1940 and as a result was made Governor General of French Equatorial Africa. It was the location of the Barrière de Reuilly, a gate built for the collection of taxation as part of the Wall of the Farmers-General; the gate was built between 1784 and 1788 and demolished in the 19th century.

Nearby is the Promenade Plantée—a 4.5 km long elevated garden along the abandoned railway which led to the former Gare de la Bastille railway station.

Like a third of the stations on the network between 1974 and 1984, the platforms of both lines were modernized in the Andreu-Motte style, in this case red on line 6 and blue for line 8, with the retention of the original bevelled white tiles in both cases.

As part of the RATP Un metro + beau program, the corridors of the station were renovated in turn and opened on 29 June 2014.

According to RATP estimates, the station saw 4,954,004 passengers enter in 2019, which places it in 86th position among metro stations for its attendance. In 2020, with the Covid-19 crisis, its annual traffic fell to 2,723,508 passengers, which ranked it 63rd.

In January 2021, the characteristic Motte masonry benches were removed from the platforms of Line 6, as well as the seats they had been surmounted until then, replaced by Akiko models of the same shade.

The station's traffic gradually recovered in 2021 with 3,634,023 entrants recorded, relegating it to the 70th position of the stations of the network for its attendance that year.

Passenger Services

Access
The station has four entrances:
 Access 1 - Place Félix-Éboué, consisting of a fixed staircase lined with an escalator going up, decorated with a candelabra and a Dervaux-type balustrade, leading to the south of this square to the right of No. 6;
 Access 2 - Rue Claude-Decaen, consisting of a fixed staircase also decorated with a mast and a Dervaux surround, located south-east of the square facing no. 100 Rue Claude-Decaen;
 Access 3 - Avenue Daumesnil, consisting of a fixed staircase lined with an escalator going up, decorated with a Guimard entrance classified as a historic monument (decree of 12 February 2016) and a Dervaux totem, located at the corner formed by Boulevard de Reuilly and Avenue Daumesnil opposite no. 199 of the latter;
 Access 4 - Rue de Reuilly, consisting of a fixed staircase with a Dervaux balustrade, leading to the right of no. 118 of this street.

Station layout

Platforms
The platforms of the two lines are of standard configuration. Two per stopping point, they are separated by the metro tracks located in the centre and the vault is elliptical.

They are furnished in the Andreu-Motte style in both cases. Those of line 6 have two red illuminated canopies, benches, and corridor outlets in flat tiles of the same shade and burgundy Akiko seats (flat red tile benches surmounted by red Motte seats), while those of line 8 have the same components in blue as well as blue Motte seats, flat coloured tiles covering the tunnel exits. This decoration is married with the bevelled white tiles for both lines. On the one hand, it is applied to the wall and tunnel exits on line 6, the vault being coated and painted white, while it covers the walls and the vault on line 8. In addition, the name of the station, inscribed on enamelled plaques, is in Parisine font for line 6 and in capital letters for line 8. The advertising frames are respectively metallic and honey-coloured ceramic with plant motifs in the interwar style of the original CMP.

Bus services
The station is served by lines 29, 46, 64 and 71 of the RATP Bus Network.

Gallery

References

Paris Métro stations in the 12th arrondissement of Paris
Railway stations in France opened in 1909